Noziya Karomatullo (born 7 February 1988) is a Tajikistani singer. Nozia sings mostly in Tajik, however she also sings in Hindi and Persian. She performs in concerts, New-Year Parties, National Day Parades, Radio and TV Programs in her native Tajikistan as well as other neighboring countries like Iran, India etc.

Early life
Noziya Karomatullo was born 7 February 1988 in Dushanbe, Tajikistan, then part of the Soviet Union. She is the daughter of a famous Tajik singer Karomatullo Qurbonov. Her father, Karomatullo Qurbonov, died on 17 October 1992 in an attack by bandits during the civil war in the Yavan district, while returning from a wedding party at night.

Education
Noziya graduated in 2005 from Maliki Sobirova and entered the conservatory in New Delhi for the academic diploma course in classical singing and dancing.

In 2010 she graduated from the Indian Conservatory with honors, and in the same year performed her first solo concert.

Noziya Karomatullo is now a 5th-year student of the Institute of Entrepreneurship and Service, Faculty of International Relations.

Personal life
She got married in the year 2014 and gave birth to a girl on 7 December 2015.

Achievements
In 2007, she won the competition of classical dance kathak in India.

References

External links
A short Bibliography of Nozia 
List of some songs sung by Nozia

1988 births
Living people
People from Dushanbe
Tajik-language singers
21st-century Tajikistani women singers
Tajikistani expatriates in India
Hindi-language singers